Niobe (minor planet designation: 71 Niobe) is a stony Gallia asteroid and relatively slow rotator from the central regions of the asteroid belt, approximately  in diameter. It was discovered by the German astronomer Robert Luther on 13 August 1861, and named after Niobe, a character in Greek mythology. In 1861, the brightness of this asteroid was shown to vary by astronomer Friedrich Tietjen.

Description 

Niobe is a member of the Gallia family, a small family of nearly 200 known stony asteroids.

In 2006, it was examined by radar using the Arecibo Observatory radio telescope in Puerto Rico. This was supplemented by optical observations intended to build a lightcurve. The resulting estimated rotation period of 35.6 hours, or 1.48 Earth days, superseded an earlier estimate of the rotation period as 14.3 hours. The radar data produced an estimate of a maximum equatorial diameter of 94 km, which is consistent with earlier estimates based upon infrared data if the shape is assumed to be slightly elongated.

The rotation period was further refined to  during observations through 2010. Six stellar occultations of this asteroid between 2004 and 2007 produced chords ranging from 13 to 72 km (8–45 mi), which are statistically consistent with the published maximum diameter estimates.

Notes

References

External links 
 Asteroid Lightcurve Database (LCDB), query form (info )
 Dictionary of Minor Planet Names, Google books
 Asteroids and comets rotation curves, CdR – Observatoire de Genève, Raoul Behrend
 Discovery Circumstances: Numbered Minor Planets (1)-(5000) – Minor Planet Center
 
 

Gallia asteroids
Niobe
Niobe
S-type asteroids (Tholen)
Xe-type asteroids (SMASS)
18610813